Ezzatabad (also Romanized as ‘Ezzatābād) is a village in Najafabad Rural District, in the Central District of Sirjan County, Kerman Province, Iran. At the 2006 census, its population was 1,677, in 401 families.

References 

Populated places in Sirjan County